Correbidia calopteridia is a moth of the subfamily Arctiinae. It was described by Arthur Gardiner Butler in 1878. It is found in Pará, Brazil.

References

Arctiinae
Moths described in 1878